Mian Abdul Manan is a Pakistani politician who had been a member of the National Assembly of Pakistan, from August 2013 to May 2018.

Political career

He ran for the seat of the National Assembly of Pakistan as a candidate of Pakistan Muslim League (N) (PML-N) from Constituency NA-83 (Faisalabad-IX) in 2008 Pakistani general election but was unsuccessful. He received 55,861 votes and lost the seat to Muhammad Ijaz Virk.

He was elected to the National Assembly as a candidate of PML-N from Constituency NA-83 (Faisalabad-IX) in by-election held in August 2013. He received 47,107 votes and defeated a candidate of Pakistan Tehreek-e-Insaf.

References

Living people
Pakistan Muslim League (N) politicians
Punjabi people
Pakistani MNAs 2013–2018
Politicians from Faisalabad
Year of birth missing (living people)